Maksim Andreyevich Zhestokov (born 19 June 1991) is a Russian football defender.

Career
Zhestokov made his professional debut for FC Rubin Kazan on 15 July 2009 in the Russian Cup game against FC Volga Tver.

On 13 July 2012, Zhestokov signed a one-year contract with Russian second division side FC Khimki.

On 24 June 2018, FC Pyunik announced the signing of Zhestokov.

References

External links
 
 

1991 births
Footballers from Kazan
Living people
Russian footballers
Russia youth international footballers
Russia under-21 international footballers
Association football defenders
FC Rubin Kazan players
FC KAMAZ Naberezhnye Chelny players
FC Khimki players
FC Volga Nizhny Novgorod players
FC Volgar Astrakhan players
FC Shinnik Yaroslavl players
FC Pyunik players
FC Neftekhimik Nizhnekamsk players
FC Amkar Perm players
Russian Premier League players
Armenian Premier League players
Russian expatriate footballers
Expatriate footballers in Armenia
FC Akron Tolyatti players